The 2009–10 Houston Cougars men's basketball team represented the University of Houston in the college basketball 2009-10 season. It was their 65th year of season play.  The head coach for the Cougars was Tom Penders, who was serving in his 6th year in that position.  The team played its home games at Hofheinz Pavilion on-campus in Houston and were members of Conference USA. The Cougars finished the season 19–16, 7–9 in C-USA play. They won the 2010 Conference USA tournament, earning them a place in the NCAA tournament for the first time since 1992. They earned a 13 seed in the Midwest Region where they were defeated by Maryland in the first round. Head coach Tom Penders retired at the end of the season.

Roster

Schedule

|-
!colspan=7|Regular season

|-
!colspan=7|Great Alaska Shootout

|-

|-
!colspan=7|Regular season

|-
!colspan=7|C-USA men's basketball tournament

|-
!colspan=7|NCAA Division I tournament

References

Houston
Houston Cougars men's basketball seasons
Houston
Houston Cougars men's b
Houston Cougars men's b